Iona National Park is the largest national park in Angola. It is situated in the Southwestern corner of the country, in Namibe Province. It is roughly bound by the Atlantic Ocean to the West, an escarpment to the East that marks the beginning of the interior plateau, the Curoca River to the North, and the Cunene River to the South.

The topography of Iona is characterised by shifting dunes, vast plains, and rough mountains and cliffs. Annual average precipitation is no more than 30 mm.  The Curoca River is intermittent but has lagoons, while the Cunene is permanent and has marshy areas at its mouth.

Iona was proclaimed as a reserve in 1937 and upgraded to a national park in 1964. However, as is true for most Angolan parks, the Angolan Civil War greatly disrupted the area. Poaching and the destruction of infrastructure have caused considerable damage to the once rich park.

In recent years, a number of government and international projects have worked on rebuilding the infrastructure of the park, which will hopefully invite tourists back. Tourism can provide tangible economic value to surrounding communities, giving them a reason to protect the park.

Geography
Iona is in the northern Namib Desert, the only true desert in Southern Africa. The area, also known as the Kaokoveld Desert, is considered one of the oldest deserts in the world at 55-80 million years old. To the east, Iona rises to the base of the Great Escarpment at the Tchamaline and Cafema mountains.  

Iona is bound on the north and south by the Kunene and Curoca Rivers, respectively.  
The climate is noteworthy for the heavy fogs created as the cold, wet air of the Benguela up-welling meets the hot, dry air of the desert. The strong fogs and currents have led to numerous shipwrecks throughout history. The coast is sometimes called Skeleton Coast after these shipwrecks as well as the numerous skeletons of whales and seals found on the beaches. The area is classified as a Hot Desert Climate, BWh in the Köppen climate classification.

The park is contiguous with the Skeleton Coast National Park in Namibia, which is itself contiguous with the Namib-Naukluft National Park so that all three protected areas form a continuous block covering some 50,000 km2 of Namib Desert coastline and adjacent dunes.

Flora and fauna

Flora
According to the Angola Ministry of the Environment, there are three types of vegetation at Iona National Park:
 Sub-coastal steppes with woody and herbaceous components: This type of vegetation is a sub-coastal African steppe-like formation dominated by Acacia, Commiphora, Colophosphormum, Aristida, Schmidita, and Staria species. 
 Coastal steppes, which corresponds to sub-desert-like vegetation: This type of vegetation is dominated by Aristida, Cissus, Salvadora, and Welwitschia species.
 Desert with moving dunes: This type of vegetation is dominated by Odyssea and Sporobolus species.

The park is the main habitat of Welwitschia mirabilis, a plant sometimes referred to as a "living fossil".  The plant derives its moisture from sea-fog dew which rolls in from the Atlantic.  The dew is absorbed through the leaves rather than through roots alone.

Fauna
Because of its distinctive habitat and climate, Iona and the Kaokoveld Desert have a number of endemic animals, particularly reptiles. Of the 63 species recorded in the ecoregion, eight are strictly endemic. The endemics include two lizards, three geckos, and three skinks.  The mouth of the Cunene River to the south supports a small wetland area that is important to migrating birds. South African cheetahs were sighted in the park for the first time in 2010.

Conservation

Since 2009, a multinational program under the UNDP has been working with the Angola Ministry of Environment and local leaders to rehabilitate the park.  Results have been recorded in the training and development of local staff, improvements to park infrastructure (fencing, roads, water supply, waste management, etc.), and the development of sound management for Iona.

This park is to be included into the Iona - Skeleton Coast Transfrontier Conservation Area.

From January 2020 Iona National Park falls under the management of African Parks, a non-governmental organization (NGO) focused on conservation. Together with the Government, African Parks will work closely with local communities, implement law enforcement, restore wildlife and position the park as a key destination, to ensure the long-term ecological, social and economic sustainability of Iona National Park.

See also

External links
  YouTube - There are Cheetahs in Angola! (Iona National Park)

References

Iona
Namibe Province
Protected areas established in 1964
1964 establishments in Angola